Ion Alecsandrescu (17 July 1928 – 21 June 2000) was the president of Steaua București during the team's golden era, between 1985 and 1989. His nickname was Sfinxul and was recently declared as Steaua Bucharest's Man of the Century.

Alecsandrescu also played football between 1947 and 1962 for Juventus București, Steaua București, CA Câmpulung Moldovenesc and Olimpia București.

He was top scorer of Liga I with 18 goals in only 22 games, in 1956.

Alecsandrescu won five championships and a Cupa României, all with Steaua București and also won four caps for Romania and one for Romania's Olympic team.

Notes

References

External links

1928 births
2000 deaths
Romanian footballers
Liga I players
Liga II players
FC Petrolul Ploiești players
FC Steaua București players
Olympia București players
FC Steaua București presidents
Association football forwards
Romania international footballers
Olympic footballers of Romania